{{Infobox person
| name               = Badru Kateregga
| image              = Amb. Al haji. Prof. Badru Dungu Kateregga.jpg
| image_size         = 
| caption            = 
| birth_date         = 
| birth_place        = Uganda
| death_date         = 
| death_place        = 
| alma_mater         = Makerere UniversityUniversity of LondonKampala University
| occupation         = University administrator, academic and entrepreneur
| years_active       = 1979–present
| nationality        = Ugandan
| citizenship        = Uganda
| known_for          = Academic leadership
| website            = https://www.profbadrukateregga.com
| honorific_prefix   = Professor
| title              = 
}}Badru Dungu Kateregga''' (born 4 December 1948), is a Ugandan academic, entrepreneur and academic administrator, who serves as the vice chancellor of Kampala University, a private university that he co-founded.

Background and education
He was born on 4 December 1948 to Hajat Aisha Nakato Namusoke and the late Hajj Kateregga, in Kabasanda village, in present-day Butambala District, in the Buganda Region of Uganda.

He attended Kabasanda Primary School, between 1956 until 1964, graduating with a Primary Leaving Certificate. He then transferred to Kabasanda Junior Secondary School, graduating with a Junior Leaving Certificate in 1967. He obtained a High School Diploma in 1969 from Kibuli Secondary School, specializing in Arts subjects.

In 1970, he was admitted to Makerere University, Uganda's oldest and largest public university, where he studied History, Religious Studies and Philosophy. He graduated three years later with a Bachelor of Arts degree. He obtained a Master of Arts degree from the School of Oriental and African Studies at the University of London, specializing in the History of the Middle East and Islamic studies.

In 2010, the Senate of Kampala University awarded him a Doctor of Letters degree.

Career
Following his graduate studies in the United Kingdom, he returned to Uganda and was appointed as a lecturer in the Department of Religious Studies and Philosophy in the Faculty of Arts at Makerere University.

Kampala University

In 1999, while still a lecturer at Makerere University, Kateregga, together with other stakeholders founded Kampala University, a multi-campus private university whose main campus is located in Ggaba, on the northern shores of Lake Victoria. In 2014, he retired from Makerere University to devote his focus on the private university that he had co-founded.

See also
 Education in Uganda
 List of Universities in Uganda
 List of university leaders in Uganda

Succession table as Vice Chancellor, Kampala University

References

External links
Website of Kampala University

1948 births
Living people
Ganda people
Ugandan Muslims
Makerere University alumni
Alumni of the University of London
Academic staff of Makerere University
Academic staff of Kampala University
People from Butambala District
People from Central Region, Uganda
Vice-chancellors of universities in Uganda